Zhuhai Gree Group Co., Ltd. is a Chinese state-owned enterprise based in Zhuhai, Guangdong Province.

Gree Group was the parent company of publicly traded companies Gree Electric and Gree Real Estate before they were transferred in the late 2010s.

History
Gree Group was an investment vehicle of Zhuhai local government, which Gree Electric and Gree Real Estate were the notable assets of the company. However, in the past, multiple managers of the company was arrested for corruption.

The stake of Gree Real Estate that held by the group was transferred to another entity of Zhuhai Municipal People's Government in mid-2015 (along with others assets, such as a management company of Zhuhai checkpoint of Hong Kong–Zhuhai–Macau Bridge).  As at 31 December 2015, Gree Group owned just 18.22% stake of Gree Electric, but able to control their board of directors by nominating them for election. Gree Group and Gree Electric also shared the same chairwoman Dong Mingzhu until November 2016. She was replaced by Zhou Lewei. Zhou also became the Party Committee Secretary of the group, replacing Meng Xiangkai.

In December 2019, the group sold 15% shares of Gree Electric to a private equity fund for CN¥41.7 billion, only retaining 3.22%. The private equity fund became the largest shareholder of Gree Electric.

Subsidiaries
current

former
 Gree Electric
 Gree Real Estate

Joint ventures
former

References

External links
  

Holding companies of China
Conglomerate companies of China
Companies owned by the provincial government of China
Companies based in Zhuhai